Ryan Clarence Buenafe (born February 1, 1990) is a Filipino former professional basketball player. From a highly touted high school basketball career with the San Sebastian College–Recoletos Staglets, Buenafe played college basketball for the Ateneo de Manila University Blue Eagles of the University Athletic Association of the Philippines (UAAP) from 2008 to 2012. He was selected 8th overall in the 2013 PBA draft by the Alaska Aces.

As a member of the Siquijor Mystics, Buenafe was involved in a controversial 2021 Pilipinas VisMin Super Cup game against the Lapu-Lapu City Heroes. The scandal caused the Pilipinas VisMin Super Cup to impose a lifetime ban on the members of Siquijor, including Buenafe. On October 2021, after a six month investigation, the Philippine Games and Amusements Board revoked Buenafe's professional license, along with other members of the Mystics, effectively barring them from playing professional basketball in the Philippines.

PBA career statistics

Correct as of October 19, 2016

Season-by-season averages

|-
| align=left | 
| align=left | Alaska
| 9 || 7.1 || .500 || .667 || .250 || 1.0 || .1 || .0 || .0 || 1.9
|-
| align=left | 
| align=left | Meralco
| 14 || 10.0 || .333 || .286 || .500 || 2.8 || .4 || .2 || .0 || 2.1
|-
| align=left | 
| align=left | Meralco
| 28 || 8.5 || .381 || .353 || .842 || 1.1 || .8 || .5 || .1 || 2.7
|-class=sortbottom
| align=center colspan=2 | Career
| 51 || 8.7 || .381 || .370 || .667 || 1.5 || .5 || .3 || .0 || 2.4

References

External links

1990 births
Living people
Filipino men's basketball players
Basketball players from Quezon City
Ateneo Blue Eagles men's basketball players
Shooting guards
Alaska Aces (PBA) players
Meralco Bolts players
Alaska Aces (PBA) draft picks

Zamboanga Valientes players